Idan Amedi, (born February 19, 1988) is an Israeli singer-songwriter and actor.

Biography
Idan Amedi was born to a Kurdish-Jewish family and raised in Jerusalem. 

Amedi specializes in various martial arts, such as taekwondo and Thai boxing. Prior to his military service in 2005, he won the title of Israel's runner-up champion in Taekwondo.

Singing career

Kochav Nolad 8 and first album: 2010-2012 
The beginning of Amedi's career as a singer and creator was in the audition for Kochav Nolad, in which Amedi performed with the song "Pain of Warriors", a song he wrote and composed himself for his experiences as a fighter during his military service in the combat engineering corps in the IDF. 

At the end of that "Kochav Nolad" season in 2010, the song "Pain of Warriors" emerged as the first single of Amedi to the radio stations, and reached first place in the various chorus parades in Israel, including the Galgalz parade and the Reshet Gimel parade.

On January 23, 2011, another single came out of the first album, Tashlich (Throw).

In May 2011, Amedi released the song Run to the Light. 

On September 5, his first full album, Idan Amedi was released. Shortly before that, he released another single, "Elaiich (To you)".

Amedi wrote and composed all the songs of the album, the song "The Last Letter", written and composed according to the letters of Moshe Ohayon R.I.P as part of the project "Soon we will become a song". Most of the songs Amedi co-edited with Itamar Meiri and Eitan Raz.

In addition, Amedi wrote a song based on Rabbi Yisrael Meir Lau's book "Don't Send Your Hand to the Boy," called "Continues to Walk," as part of "The Voice Still Remains" project in collaboration with Reshet Gimel and Holocaust Memorial Information.

The album also includes "Pain of Warriors", which won the title "Song of the Year" in the annual 2011 chorus parades.

In the same year, Amedi also won the Rookie of the Year title in the Reshet Gimel network. The album was released by 'Aroma Music'.

In May 2012, Idan Amedi's debut album reached the status of a gold album after sales of over 20,000 copies.

The second album - "Bazman Hahachron (Recently)": 2013-2014 
In February 2013, Amedi's second album, Bazman Hahachron (Recently) was released. The two singles that preceded the album,  "Nigmar (Finished)" and "Beautiful Things to See" were successful and reached the top of the various chants. Next to the album came another single, "MIshum Ma (For some reason)".

In this album, Amdi continued to collaborate with the producers of his first album, Itamar Meiri and Eitan Raz.

In August 2013, Amedi's second album, Bazman Hahachron (Recently) reached the status of a gold album.

The song "Finished" won the "Song of the Year" title in the annual network of three-year chorus, and thus Amdi completed two winners of the title. Amdi even won the "Singer of the Year" title in this march.

"Nigmar (Finished)" is a song that Amedi wrote during his military service, telling the mosaic of Israeli society about "Oferet Yetzuka" Operation, in which Amedi participated as a combat commander in the combat engineering corps.

Years after the release of this album, Bazman Hahachron (Recently) and "Nigmar (Finished)."

The third album - "Ratzinu Lihiyot (we wanted to be)": 2014-2015 
In October 2014, Amedi's debut single ("Old Voice of Memory") came out of his third album, Ratzinu Lihiyot (we wanted to be)". The song is about his memories of the Nahlaot neighborhood where his   grandparents lived. It was first place on the Galgalz hit parade for a month. 

In January 2015, he released Menasim (Trying) which combines Hebrew and Arabic. Three years later, a remake of the song became the theme song for the second season of the TV show Fauda, in which Amedi plays Sagi.

In this album, he performs a duet of "Yah Ribon Olam" with his brother Elad.

On May 17 of that year the album Ratzinu Lihiyot (We wanted to be) was released, produced by Tom Cohen.

The fourth album - "Chelek Mehazman (Part of the time)": 2016-2019 
On March 14, 2016, Amedi released the first single from his fourth album, called Chelek Mehazman (Part of the time) as the album's name, which he originally wrote for singer Rita. The song reached seventh place in the Galgalatz hit parade.

He released two more singles ("Ad Sheyaale Hayom Haba (until the next day)" and "Achshav Kulam Rokdim (Now everyone is dancing)"), in January 2017.

In March 2017, two months after the release of Chelek Mehazman (Part of the time), the album won   gold album status following the sale of 20,000 copies. In January 2018, the album reached the platinum album status of over 40,000 copies. 

In 2018, he won first place in the Soldier hit parade marking Israel's 70th anniversary. In the summer of that year, he performed at the amphitheater in Caesarea.

The fifth album - 2020 
In January 2019, Amedi released "Ma At Margisha (What Do You Feel)", the first single for his fifth album to be released by the end of 2020.

In June 2019 he released "Ani Rotze (I Want)", and in February 2020, "Mipo Lesham (From Here To There)". 
In May 2020, the single "Remember Almost Everything" came out. He wrote and directed the clip himself.

Acting career
In 2017, Amedi joined the cast of the TV drama Fauda. and began playing the character of Sagi Tzur - a new undercover man who joined the team.

Sagi is a new fighter on the undercover team, but has less experience. He arrives following a transfer from another military unit.

In Season 3, his character is almost fired from the team after strangling a woman, which could have caused her death during an operation on the field. In addition, he has an affair with Nurit while she is engaged to someone else.

Amedi will also participate in the fourth season of Fauda when it comes up.

Discography
 Idan Amedi (2011)
 Bazman Hahachron (Recently) (2013)
 Ratzinu Lihiyot (we wanted to be) (2015)
 Chelek Mehazman (Part of the time) (2017)
 Zocher Kimaat Hakol (Remember Almost Everything) (2023)

References

Living people
1988 births
Musicians from Jerusalem
21st-century Israeli male singers
Israeli male television actors
Jewish Israeli male actors
Israeli people of Kurdish-Jewish descent
Israeli Sephardi Jews
Kokhav Nolad contestants
Male actors from Jerusalem